Wild Oats is an American television sitcom that aired Sunday nights on Fox in 1994.

Overview
The series focuses on a group of twenty-something friends in Chicago: Jack, a photographer; Brian, a social worker; Shelly, a fifth-grade teacher; and Liz, a hairdresser.

Wild Oats aired on Fox at 9:30 ET on Sunday nights. Despite having the aging but still-popular Married... with Children as a lead-in, the new show drew small audiences against the other networks, who all ran highly-rated movies from 9pm onward. The comedy was canceled after only four episodes, leaving two others unaired.

Cast 
Tim Conlon as Jack Slayton
Paul Stephen Rudd as Brian Grant
Paula Marshall as Shelly Thomas
Jana Marie Hupp as Liz Bradford
Christine Cavanaugh as Kathee

Episodes

References

External links
 
 

1990s American sitcoms
1994 American television series debuts
1994 American television series endings
Television series by 20th Century Fox Television
Television shows set in Chicago
Fox Broadcasting Company original programming
English-language television shows